Paul Bishop is an Australian actor and politician who has served as the Division 10 Councillor in Redland City since 2012.

Acting career
Born in Gladstone, Queensland, raised in Wynnum, Queensland Bishop's film debut was in Bruce Beresford's 1997 movie Paradise Road, and appeared as Sergeant Ben Stewart on Blue Heelers from 1998 to 2004 for which he received Logie nominations in both 1999 and 2000. Other roles include the TeleMovie " Never Tell me Never", MDA III, Heartbreak High, and GP with ABCTV, HouseGang with SBS, and Murder Call for Channel 9.

Theatre roles include The Importance of Being Earnest, Three Days of Rain, Money and Friends, Take Me Out, The Shaughraun, at Melbourne Theatre Company, Blackrock, The John Wayne Principle and Anthony Crowley's The Frail Man at Melbourne's Playbox, The John Wayne Principle, As You Like It, Poor Super Man, Saint Joan, Amy's View and Money and Friends with Sydney Theatre Company. Romeo and Juliet, Oedipus Rex, Away, Taming of the Shrew, The Game of Love and Chance and more than 20 other professional credits with Queensland Theatre Company since 1986.

In 2006, Bishop appeared in the movie 48 Shades, based on the Nick Earls novel 48 Shades of Brown and he appeared on stage in Operator for La Boite Theatre, The Carnivores for Black Swan Theatre, Perth, The Woman Before and Puss in Boots with Queensland Theatre Company. 
In 2007 he performed in and toured Private Fears in Public Places for QTC and NSW tour, and played a minor role in the feature 'How To Change in 9 Weeks'.

Filmography
House Gang (TV series 1996)
G.P. (TV series 1996)
Paradise Road (1997)
Murder Call (TV series 1997)
Never Tell Me Never (TV movie 1998)
Blue Heelers (TV series 1998–2004)
MDA (TV series 2005)
48 Shades (2006)
H2O: Just Add Water (TV series 2006)
In Her Skin (2009)
Sisters of War (TV movie 2010)
Reef Doctors (TV series 2013)
Mako: Island of Secrets (TV series 2015–2016)
Wanted (TV series 2016)
The Bureau of Magical Things (TV series 2018)

References

External links
 

Living people
Australian male stage actors
Australian male television actors
1966 births
People educated at Brisbane State High School
People from Redland City